Simon Christer Sandberg (born 25 March 1994) is a Swedish footballer who plays as a right back for BK Häcken in Allsvenskan.

Early life
Sandberg grew up in Partille and played both football, with the local club Björndammens BK, and handball during his youth. His father Dennis Sandberg is a professional handball coach. In 2009, at age 15, he was invited to train with Hammarby IF in Allsvenskan, the Swedish top tier, but was not offered a contract. Instead, he signed with BK Häcken the same year and joined their youth academy.

Club career

BK Häcken
Sandberg signed his first professional contract with BK Häcken in 2012, and made his competitive debut in Allsvenskan on 23 May 2013 in a 3–0 win against Syrianska FC. He soon established himself as a starter at Häcken, playing both as a central defender and full back. Sandberg would move on to make a total of 61 league appearances for Häcken, scoring once, between 2013 and 2016.

Most notably, Sandberg scored the decisive penalty when Häcken won the 2015–16 Svenska Cupen, the club's first ever domestic title, beating Malmö FF in the final after a 2–2 draw (5–6 on penalties).

Levski Sofia
On 9 July 2016, Sandberg was sold to Levski Sofia in the Bulgarian First League, signing a three year-deal. A transfer fee of around 2 million Swedish kronor (approximately £0,12 million) was suggested, as he only had six months left on his contract with the Swedish club.

Sandberg saw his playing time limited at Levski Sofia, with his stint at the club being plagued by several serious injuries. He also fell out of favour with manager Elin Topuzakov soon after his arrival. Sandberg left the club in November 2017 by mutual consent, after only making five league appearances for Levski Sofia.

Hammarby IF
On 30 November 2017, ahead of the 2018 Allsvenskan, Sandberg returned to Sweden, signing a two year-contract with Hammarby IF. He made his debut for the club in a 3–1 home win against IK Sirius on 1 April. During the season, Sandberg played 23 league games for Hammarby as the club finished 4th in the table.

On 4 May 2019, Sandberg signed a three and a half-year extension with Hammarby, running until 2022. Throughout the 2019 season, Sandberg played 28 league games and provided seven assists as Hammarby finished 3rd in the table, after eight straight wins at the end of the campaign. After the season, he was nominated as Defender of the Year in Allsvenskan, but eventually lost out on the award.

In 2020, a season postponed due to the COVID-19 pandemic, Sandberg was plagued by a hip injury and only featured in 20 games, as the side disappointedly finished 8th in the table.

On 30 May 2021, Sandberg won the 2020–21 Svenska Cupen with Hammarby through a 5–4 win on penalties (0–0 after full-time) against his former club BK Häcken in the final. Sandberg featured in both legs as the club was knocked out in the play-off round of the 2021–22 UEFA Europa Conference League by Basel (4–4 on aggregate) on penalties, where he scored his attempt. On 7 November 2021, Sandberg scored his first competitive goal for the club in a 3–2 Allsvenskan home win against Örebro SK.

Sandberg featured in the final of the 2021–22 Svenska Cupen, in which Hammarby lost by 4–5 on penalties to Malmö FF after the game ended in a 0–0 draw. On 31 December 2022, Sandberg left Hammarby at the expiration of his contract. In total, he made 122 Allsvenskan appearances for the club.

Return to Häcken
On 21 February 2023, Sandberg returned to his former club BK Häcken, signing a three-year contract.

International career
Sandberg was called up to the Swedish senior squad for the training tour in early 2020. He made his debut in a 1–0 friendly win against Kosovo on 12 January.

Career statistics

Club

Honours
BK Häcken
 Svenska Cupen: 2015–16

Hammarby IF
 Svenska Cupen: 2020–21

References

External links
 
 Profile at Levskisofia.info

1994 births
Living people
Swedish footballers
Sweden youth international footballers
Sweden under-21 international footballers
Sweden international footballers
BK Häcken players
PFC Levski Sofia players
Hammarby Fotboll players
Allsvenskan players
First Professional Football League (Bulgaria) players
Swedish expatriate footballers
Expatriate footballers in Bulgaria
Association football defenders